"Even Better Than the Real Thing" is a 1991 song by U2.

Even Better Than the Real Thing may also refer to:

 "Even Better Than The Real Thing" (Instant Star episode), an episode of the Instant Star TV series
 Even Better Than the Real Thing (charity album series), a series of Irish charity albums
 Even Better than the Real Thing Vol. 1, the first volume of the series
 Even Better than the Real Thing Vol. 2, the second volume of the series
 Even Better than the Real Thing Vol. 3, the third volume of the series
 Even Better Than the Real Thing, a 2017 BBC TV series

See also 
 Even Better Than the Disco Thing